The KZ8A is a broad gauge electric freight locomotive developed by Alstom for Kazakhstan Temir Zholy – national railway company of Kazakhstan. In October 2010, KTZ placed an order for 200 locomotives.

Initially, they will be built in Belfort, France; production later shifting to a new factory in Astana. The first KZ8A off the production line was unveiled in October 2012.

Specification
The locomotives will be among the most powerful in the world, capable of hauling 9000 tonne freight trains; they have also been designed to cope with extremes of temperature.

The locomotives will weight 200 tonnes, with 8.8MW power output and a maximum speed of 120 km/h.

KZ4AT

Alstom started the production of passenger electric locomotives Prima M4 "KZ4AT" in the EKZ joint venture in Nur-Sultan (Astana), Kazakhstan in June 2019. These locomotives are part of the contract signed with KTZ (Kazakhstan Railways) for delivery and maintenance of 302 Prima T8 "KZ8A" and 119 Prima M4 "KZ4AT" electric locomotives. The first passenger locomotive should be ready by the end of 2019 and then certified as new and premiere product "Made in Kazakhstan".

References

Alstom locomotives
Bo′Bo′+Bo′Bo′ locomotives
Electric locomotives of Kazakhstan
25 kV AC locomotives
Railway locomotives introduced in 2012
5 ft gauge locomotives